Abryanz Style and Fashion Awards 2019, themed The Stars, was the seventh edition of the Abryanz Style and Fashion Awards (ASFAs) that honored stars in the fashion industry in Africa. It was held on 13 December 2019 at the Kampala Serena Hotel in Kampala.

Headliners
The three major headline acts were by American rapper, singer-songwriter and record producer Jidenna, British fashion designer Ozwald Boateng and South African fashion designer David Tlale. Jidenna had also been previously confirmed to perform at the Blankets and Wine Festival in Kampala on 15 December the same year.

Jidenna received the Icon Award and Boateng was awarded with the Lifetime Achievement Award for infusing a trademark twist on classic British tailoring and bespoke style. Other honorary awards awarded that night were the Star Maker award awarded to Joram Muzira, Positive Change award to Susan Guerts and Special Recognition Award for Innovation awarded to Kayiira.

History
Nominations were opened on 8 October 2019 and closed later that month and the list of nominees was released at a Fashionpreneur Summit and nomination party on 26 October 2019 in Kampala. Public voting for the nominees was opened on 11 November and ran up to 10 December. Like all previous events, the public vote would carry 30% and the ASFAs' panel vote would carry 70%. It was earlier announced that Jidenna and Ozwald Boateng would receive honorary awards of Star Icon Award and Lifetime Achievement Award respectively for their work in the fashion industry in Africa.

Honorary awards

Nominees and Winners

See also 
 Abryanz Style and Fashion Awards (ASFAs)

References

External links 

 

Award ceremonies
Fashion awards
African awards
Annual events in Uganda
Fashion events in Africa